Heliothodes diminutivus, the small heliothodes moth, is a moth of the family Noctuidae. The species was first described by Augustus Radcliffe Grote in 1873. It is found in the western US from California, through Oregon to Washington.

The wingspan is 15–19 mm.

External links
 
 
 Images

Heliothinae